Demirdöş (also known as Demirtaş) is a village in the Kiğı District, Bingöl Province, Turkey. The village is populated by Kurds of non-tribal affiliation and had a population of 9 in 2021.

The hamlet of Tophane is attached to the village.

References 

Villages in Kiğı District
Kurdish settlements in Bingöl Province